The Battle of Reinbek, or Skirmish of Reinbek, on May 30, 1700 was a small engagement at the river of Bille near Reinbek in Schleswig-Holstein, Germany, as a consequence of the Danish invasion of Holstein-Gottorp, earlier that year.

Background
Combined Swedish-Hanoverian-Lüneburgian forces (guarantors by the treaty of Holstein-Gottorp, along with England and the Netherlands) of 17,500 men, under the supreme command of Nils Gyllenstierna, were ready to march towards the 20,000 strong Danish army under Ferdinand Willem, Duke of Württemberg, to relief the Siege of Tönning. Danish forces of 5,600 men were positioned partly behind the river of Bille, in a 45 kilometer long defensive line, in an attempt to block them.

Battle
Gyllenstierna, approaching with the bulk of his forces from the south—around 11,000 Swedes and Lüneburgians—split these in two; he marched towards 2,000 Danes with four cannons at Reinbek, under Carl Rudolf, Prince of Württemberg (the brother of Willem), with about 5,000-7,000 men of his own. The other section was ordered to go around and attack the Danish positions from the back. After reaching Reinbek, Gyllenstierna sent two Swedish battalions to the bridge, while four cannons were dragged up to the heights, by which a rather insignificant firefight commenced between the two sides. The fighting continued until dawn, when the Prince of Württemberg, fearing he would get outflanked, decided to destroy the bridge and withdraw with all of his forces.

Aftermath
Only a fraction of the two armies had been engaged in the fighting and the losses sustained on both sides had barely reached ten men. The siege was lifted soon thereafter and, after a Swedish landing in Zealand on August 4, the Danish king Frederick IV signed the Peace of Travendal on August 18, 1700.

References 

 
 

Conflicts in 1700
1700s in the Holy Roman Empire
Battles of the Great Northern War
Battles involving Denmark
Battles involving Sweden
Battles in Schleswig-Holstein